Truro Island lies within the Arctic Archipelago in the Qikiqtaaluk Region of northern Canada's territory of Nunavut. It is one of the mid-waterway islands in the McDougall Sound between Bathurst Island and Cornwallis Island.

Collaborative Interdisciplinary Cryospheric Experiment
Truro Island was the base camp for several Collaborative Interdisciplinary Cryospheric Experiment (C-ICE) studies which provide data on atmosphere, sea ice, and ocean interaction, including C-ICE'2000, C-ICE'2001, and C-ICE'2002.

See also 
 David G. Barber

References

External links 
 Truro Island in the Atlas of Canada - Toporama; Natural Resources Canada
 Collaborative Interdisciplinary Cryospheric Experiment (C-ICE)- scientific experiments on Truro Island
 Synopsis Of The Polaris Zn-Pb-Cu District, Canadian Arctic Islands, Nunavut- mining on Truro Island

Islands of the Queen Elizabeth Islands
Uninhabited islands of Qikiqtaaluk Region